Noyes E. Leech (August 1, 1921 – July 1, 2010) was an American lawyer and professor.

Early life and education
Leech was born in Ambler, Pennsylvania, to Charles Sherman and Margaret (Reid) Leech.

He attended Lower Merion High School (1939), and received his BA from the University of Pennsylvania in 1943, and his JD from the University of Pennsylvania Law School in 1948. During Leech's third year of law school, he served as editor-in-chief of the University of Pennsylvania Law Review. While pursuing the study of law, Leech reestablished the Mitchell Club as a diverse group of fellow legal students.

Career
Leech worked at the law firm of Dechert, Price & Rhoads, and practiced law privately in Philadelphia. From 1943 to 1945 he was a staff sergeant in the U.S. Army.

Leech was the Ferdinand Wakeman Hubbell professor of law and the William A. Schnader professor of law at the University of Pennsylvania Law School.

He was Editor of the Restatement of the Foreign Relations Law of the United States (1965).

References 

University of Pennsylvania Law School alumni
Lawyers from Philadelphia
University of Pennsylvania alumni
United States Army non-commissioned officers
20th-century American lawyers
University of Pennsylvania Law School faculty
1921 births
2010 deaths
United States Army personnel of World War II
People from Ambler, Pennsylvania
International law scholars